Obscurior is a genus of moths of the family Erebidae erected by Michael Fibiger in 2010.

Species
Obscurior lateraprocessa Fibiger, 2010
Obscurior clarus Fibiger, 2010
Obscurior niasiensis Fibiger, 2010
Obscurior fragilis Fibiger, 2010
Obscurior davisi Fibiger, 2010

References

Micronoctuini
Noctuoidea genera